Urophora quadrifasciata is a species of tephritid or fruit flies in the genus Urophora of the family Tephritidae. The host plant for the larvae is usually a knapweed (Centaurea sp), and because of this, it is used to control Centaurea stoebe.

Distribution
Europe & Kazakhstan, North Africa & Iran; introduced North America & Australia.

References

Urophora
Insects described in 1826
Diptera of Europe
Diptera of Asia
Diptera of Africa